Cipari Archaeological Park is a megalithic site in Cigugur District, Kuningan Regency, West Java, Indonesia, which is said to be dated to 1000 BCE.

References

Megalithic monuments in Indonesia
Kuningan Regency